Chlorochroa sayi, or Say's stink bug, is a species of stink bug in the family Pentatomidae.  It is found in North America.

References

Further reading

 
 
 

Insects described in 1872
Pentatomini